Moving On is the second studio album by Swedish singer Sarah Dawn Finer. It was released on 26 August 2009 and peaked at number one on the Swedish Albums Chart.

Track listing
Standing Strong (Sarah Dawn Finer, Michel Zitron, Tobias Gustavsson)
Stupid (Sarah Dawn Finer, Fredrik Kempe)
Anything Tonight (Sarah Dawn Finer, Fredrik Kempe, Anders Hansson)
Moving On (Sarah Dawn Finer, Fredrik Kempe)
Virus (Sarah Dawn Finer, Björn Djupström, Papaconstantinou, Alex)
Is That Enough (Sarah Dawn Finer, Dilba)
Not the One (Sarah Dawn Finer, Dilba)
Right Track (Sarah Dawn Finer, Magnus Tingsek)
I Don't Need Your Love Song (Sarah Dawn Finer, Magnus Tingsek)
Does She Know You (Sarah Dawn Finer, Tom Howe, Iain James, Glen Scott)
What if this is Love (Sarah Dawn Finer, Peter Kvint, Aleena)
For a Friend (Sarah Dawn Finer, Peter Hallström)

Contributors
Sarah Dawn Finer - vocals
Johan Fransson - drums
Joacim Beckman – programming, producer
Johan Röhr - programming, producer

Charts

References 

2009 albums
Sarah Dawn Finer albums